Kate Hall is an American television soap opera writer. She is the daughter of veteran soap opera writer and actor Courtney Simon and soap opera actor Peter Simon.

Positions held
All My Children
 Script Writer: August 16, 2007 –September 23, 2011

General Hospital
 Script Writer: August 25, 2011- October 29, 2015; March 20, 2017 – present

General Hospital: Night Shift
 Writer: Love's Labors

The Young and the Restless
 Script Writer: January 25, 2016 - January 11, 2017

External links
Kate Hall on TV.com

Year of birth missing (living people)
Living people
American soap opera writers